Carate Urio is a comune (municipality) in the Province of Como in the Italian region Lombardy, located about  north of Milan and about  northeast of Como.

Founded in 1927 by the merger of Carate Lario and Urio, Carate Urio borders the following municipalities: Brienno, Faggeto Lario, Laglio, Moltrasio, Schignano, Torno.

References

Cities and towns in Lombardy